At any given point in time, the personnel at Sobibor extermination camp included 18-25 German and Austrian SS officers and roughly 400 watchmen of Soviet origin. Over the 18 months that the camp was in service, 100 SS officers served there.

SS personnel

Soviet prisoners of war
Ivan Klatt
Emanuel Schultz
B. Bielakow
Ivan Nikiforow
Mikhail Affanaseivitch Razgonayev
J. Zajcew
Ivan Demjanjuk (alleged; conviction pending appeal not upheld by German criminal court)
Emil Kostenko
M. Matwiejenko
W. Podienko
Fiodor Tichonowski
Iwan Karakasz (deserted and joined Soviet partisans)
Kaszewacki (deserted and joined Soviet partisans)
Wiktor Kisiljew (escaped along with Jewish prisoners in 1941, killed by police)
Wasyl Zischer (escaped along with Jewish prisoners in 1941, killed by police)

References

 

Sobibor extermination camp personnel
Sobibor extermination camp
Holocaust perpetrators in Poland
Lists of World War II topics